Hubert Douglas (15 May 1907 – 1977) was a Canadian cross-country skier. He competed in the men's 50 kilometre event at the 1932 Winter Olympics.

References

1907 births
1977 deaths
Canadian male cross-country skiers
Olympic cross-country skiers of Canada
Cross-country skiers at the 1932 Winter Olympics
Skiers from Ottawa